Lauterbur is a surname. Notable people with the surname include: 

Frank Lauterbur (1925–2013), American football player and coach
Paul Lauterbur (1929–2007), American chemist